The 2013 FIBA Asia 3x3 Championship was the first edition of the FIBA Asia 3X3 championship. The games were held in Doha, Qatar between 15–16 May 2013.

Men

Preliminary round

Group A

Group B

Group C

Group D

Knockout round

Women

Preliminary round

Group A

Group B

Knockout round

Medalists

Award
Dream Team All Star Selection
 Men: Boney Watson (QAT), Fadel El Zubi (JOR), Mousa Nabipour (IRI)
 Women: Geethu Anna Jose (IND), Nigyara Nagiyeva (TKM), Lea Abi Ghosn (LBN)

References

Results (Archived)

External links
 Official Website

2012–13 in Asian basketball
Basketball
International basketball competitions hosted by Qatar
2013
2013 in 3x3 basketball
International women's basketball competitions hosted by Qatar